Cell C Limited (stylised as Cell ©) is a private mobile operator based in Sandstone, South Africa. It was founded in November 2001 by Lambert Moloi. As of August 2019, the company’s current CEO is Douglas Craigie Stevenson.

Challenger Network 
Cell C Limited is a mobile operator in South Africa, acting as a disruption and pushing for regulatory changes such as lower and asymmetrical mobile termination rates. A study commissioned by the South African National Treasury and conducted by the University of Johannesburg's Center for Competition, Regulation and Economic Development found that the lower termination rates were introduced in 2011.

References

External links

Mobile phone companies of South Africa
Telecommunications companies established in 2001
South African companies established in 2001
Privately held companies of South Africa
Companies based in Johannesburg